Elias Sinkko (23 February 1871, Lemi – 3 January 1957) was a Finnish agronomist and politician. He was a Member of the Parliament of Finland from 1909 to 1910, from 1913 to 1922 and again from 1927 to 1929, representing the Young Finnish Party until December 1918 and the National Progressive Party thereafter.

References

1871 births
1957 deaths
People from Lemi
People from Viipuri Province (Grand Duchy of Finland)
Young Finnish Party politicians
National Progressive Party (Finland) politicians
Members of the Parliament of Finland (1909–10)
Members of the Parliament of Finland (1913–16)
Members of the Parliament of Finland (1916–17)
Members of the Parliament of Finland (1917–19)
Members of the Parliament of Finland (1919–22)
Members of the Parliament of Finland (1927–29)
People of the Finnish Civil War (White side)
University of Helsinki alumni